Fred Parker Jr. (born 1980) is an American film, television and stage actor. He is known for his stage performances in The Best Man and Damage Control both in 2012.

Early life and education
Born and raised in San Antonio, Texas, he attended the Northside Independent School District where he wanted to become an actor at the age of 12. When he was in junior high, he won University Interscholastic League (UIL) acting awards for his role in Hamlet. He also won numerous National Forensic League awards in prose, poetry and duet acting.

He went on to attend the University of Texas at Austin, where he received a Bachelor of Arts in Theatre and Dance. In college, he performed in plays such as As You Like It, and Vieux Carre. In 2012, he took four levels of improv training with the Upright Citizens Brigade Theatre in Hollywood and has worked with acting coach Marco Perella.

Career

Film
In 2009, Parker's first film appearance was in From Mexico with Love as Jakes' Lackey, an uncredited role. He then went on to have small parts in the film Deeper and Deeper (2010) and in the TV series 90210 (2010).

In October 2014, it was announced that Parker would play country music singer Faron Young in the upcoming biopic about Hank Williams (played by Tom Hiddleston) titled I Saw the Light. The film is set to release sometime in 2015.

Theatre
Parker became friends with playwright Gore Vidal in 2011 who introduced Parker to theatre director Michael Wilson. It was then that Parker was cast as Howie Annenberg in Vidal's play The Best Man directed by Wilson in 2012 alongside James Earl Jones and John Larroquette. Parker has also performed in the off-Broadway play Damage Control as Chip Donahue.

Personal life
Parker is a member of the Screen Actors Guild (SAG).

Filmography

References

External links

1980 births
Living people
Male actors from San Antonio
University of Texas at Austin College of Fine Arts alumni
21st-century American male actors
American male film actors
American male stage actors